Télécom Bretagne (formerly known as ENST Bretagne) was a French grande école of engineering, and a research centre providing training in information technologies and telecommunications. In 2017, it merged with École des mines de Nantes to form IMT Atlantique.

As a member of the Institut Mines-Télécom, it had three campuses:
 Plouzané, in the Technopôle Brest-Iroise, near Brest (France);
 Campus de Beaulieu, in Rennes (France);
 SUPAERO campus, in Toulouse (France).

Télécom Bretagne had been the source of breakthroughs in the world of telecommunications, notably the turbo codes (first published in Proc. IEEE ICC'93) used extensively in 3G mobile telephony standards.

History 

 1974: Pierre Lelong – Secretary of State for the PTT (literally Postal Telegraph and Telephone) – decides to establish a second school of telecommunications that will be located in the Brest area.
 1977: Creation of ENST Bretagne in Brest. Admission of the first student body which counted 31 students.
 1986: Creation of the Rennes site.
 1997: Creation of the Groupe des Écoles des Télécommunications (GET).
 2008: Renamed Télécom Bretagne.
 2012: Creation of the Institut Mines-Télécom.
 2017: Fusion with École des Mines de Nantes to form IMT Atlantique.

Master of engineering 

For students admitted in formation initiale (FI, literally initial formation), the curriculum takes 3 years and deals with six main domains in 1st and 2nd year:
 Mathematics and signal processing
 Electronics and physics
 Computer science
 Networks
 Economy and social sciences
 Languages and intercultural dimensions

and 4 options in 3rd year :
 Engineering and system integration
 Software systems and networks
 Services and business engineering

Master of Sciences 

Télécom Bretagne delivers Master of Science degrees, which are fully compliant with the Bologna system. MSc is a two-year training course leading to a high level of expertise in Information Technologies (IT):
 MSc in Telecommunication Systems Engineering
 MSc in Design and Engineering of Communication Networks
 MSc in Computer Science & Decision Systems
 MSc in Information Systems Project Management & Consulting
          
 (Mastères spécialisés, masters de recherche, PhDs...)

Admission 

Admission for the Engineering degree is decided, for most French students, through competitive examination after two to three years of mostly theoretical physics and mathematics classes in CPGE. Foreign students and a few French students are selected after undergraduate or graduate studies based on their results and specific tests.

Notable alumni
 Pierre Gattaz, CEO of Radiall, president of MEDEF
 Jean-Marc Jézéquel, computer scientist and author, director of IRISA
 Imad Sabouni, Minister of Communications and Technology of Syria

Notable faculty 
 Adrienne Jablanczy, President of the Institut supérieur européen de gestion group

See also
 Institut Mines-Télécom
 Télécom ParisTech
 Télécom & Management SudParis

External links
 Official site
 Official facebook
 Students' web pages
 Alumni Association
 Junior Entreprise
 ESN Section

Grandes écoles
Education in Brest, France
Buildings and structures in Brest, France
Educational institutions established in 1977
History of telecommunications in France
1977 establishments in France
Telecommunication education